The Konrad Adenauer Foundation (KAS) is a German political party foundation associated with but independent of the centre-right Christian Democratic Union (CDU). The foundation's headquarters are located in Sankt Augustin near Bonn, as well as in Berlin. Globally, the KAS has 78 offices and runs programs in over 100 countries. Its current chairman is the former President of the German parliament Deutscher Bundestag, Norbert Lammert. It is a member of the Martens Centre, the official foundation and think tank of the European People's Party (EPP). In 2020, it ranked 15th amongst think tanks globally.

Establishment and mission
The establishment of a “systematic civic-education program inspired by Christian democratic values” began being considered in 1952 by a group of CDU politicians including Bundestag president Hermann Ehlers, Robert Tillmanns, and Heinrich Krone. On 20 December 1955, the Society for Christian Democratic Education, which would be renamed after Chancellor Konrad Adenauer on 13 October 1964, was opened in Bonn.

The aim of the foundation's civic education programs is, according to their official website, the “promotion of freedom and liberty, peace, and justice” through “furthering European unification, improving transatlantic relations, and deepening development cooperation”. Their function as a think-tank and consulting agency is intended to provide citizens with a basis for political action through the research and analyses of current political trends. The KAS offers more than 2,500 conferences and events each year worldwide, and actively supports the political involvement and education of intellectually gifted youth through a prestigious scholarship program as well as an ongoing comprehensive seminar program.

Institution
Along with the headquarters in Sankt Augustin and Berlin, the KAS operates two educational centers, sixteen training centers, an Academy, and an international conference center.

The KAS consists of six departments: 
 The aforementioned Academy located in Berlin, which hosts symposia, conferences, meetings, and exhibitions in order to analyze relevant societal and political issues in a public setting.
 The Archive for Christian Democratic Policy (ACDP) documents and researches Christian Democracy’s historical development.
 The department for European and International Cooperation engages itself with international politics through the functions of the foundation's more than 200 projects in around 120 countries.
 The Politics and Consulting department is the think tank of the KAS.
 The department for Civic Education combats the status quo, looking to invoke citizen participation in an era where freedom and peace are taken for granted.
 The  Scholarships and Cultural Activities department provides financial and moral support to roughly 2,000 students.

Former President of the Bundestag Norbert Lammert is the current President of the KAS. He is joined on the Board of Directors by 24 other individuals. The KAS currently has 55 members, many of whom are current and former CDU politicians. The Board of Trustees has 24 members who assist and supervise the work of the KAS.

Finances
Similar to other German political foundations, the Konrad Adenauer Foundation is largely financed by federal and land government funds. 96.8% of the foundation's €120 million budget in 2009 was therefore provided by public funding, while 2.7% was derived from admission charges and miscellaneous revenues, and 0.5% came from private funds and donations.

Prizes
The Konrad Adenauer Foundation awards a prize for young scholars, named after the CDU politician Bruno Heck, a prize for local journalists and a literature prize.

Cooperation with other foundations and organizations
In Bavaria, the Hanns Seidel Foundation operates in lieu of the Konrad-Adenauer Foundation; in Schleswig-Holstein, the Hermann-Ehlers-Foundation assumes the Adenauer Foundation's role. These two CDU-friendly foundations are not the Adenauer Foundation's only collaborators; for instance, the Adenauer Foundation co-published a study with the Bertelsmann Foundation, the Market Economy Foundation, and the Friedrich-Naumann-Foundation titled "Educational Policy in a Federal System and International Influences", in which it injected itself into the dialogue on educational policy and examined various influences. Furthermore, the Adenauer Foundation authored a "Common Declaration" in partnership with the Friedrich-Ebert-Foundation, the Friedrich-Naumann-Foundation, the Hans-Seidel-Foundation, and the Heinrich-Boell-Foundation which explored various mission statements and financing models of political foundations in Germany. The KAS is a member of "European Movement Germany". As a member of the market-oriented Stockholm Network, the KAS cooperates with other foundations and think tanks in issues pertaining to European politics.

Former Scholars
Former scholars of the foundation have been Thomas de Maizière, Peter Altmaier, Christian Wulff, Karl Lauterbach, Uwe Barschel, Tom Enders, Stefan Hell,
Armin Laschet, Friedrich Merz, Detlef Seif, and Ruprecht Polenz.

See also
The other parties in Germany also use the legal form of a foundation for support and public relations purposes. The other foundations are:
Desiderius-Erasmus-Stiftung (AfD)
Friedrich Ebert Foundation (SPD)
Friedrich Naumann Foundation für die Freiheit (FDP)
Hanns Seidel Foundation (CSU)
Heinrich Böll Foundation (Grüne)
Rosa Luxemburg Foundation (Die Linke).

References

Further reading
“Mission: Democracy!”

External links

 

Christian Democratic Union of Germany
Christian democracy in Europe
Conservatism in Germany
Foundations based in Germany
Liberal conservatism
Political and economic think tanks based in Germany
Political organisations based in Germany